Leap Year is a 1932 British comedy film directed by Tom Walls, who co-stars with Anne Grey, Edmund Breon and Ellis Jeffreys. Made at British and Dominion's Elstree Studios, it was written by A. R. Rawlinson, and produced by Herbert Wilcox. The film was re-released in 1937.

Plot summary

Cast
 Tom Walls as Sir Peter Traillon
 Anne Grey as Paula Zahren
 Edmund Breon as Jack Debrant
 Ellis Jeffreys as Mrs Debrant
 Jeanne Stuart as Angela Mallard
 Charles Carson as Sir Archibald Mallard
 Laurence Hanray as Hope
 Franklyn Bellamy as Silas
 Joan Brierley as Girl

References

Bibliography
 Low, Rachael. Filmmaking in 1930s Britain. George Allen & Unwin, 1985.
 Wood, Linda. British Films, 1927-1939. British Film Institute, 1986.

External links
 
 
 Photographs

1932 films
1932 comedy films
Films directed by Tom Walls
British comedy films
British black-and-white films
British and Dominions Studios films
Films shot at Imperial Studios, Elstree
1930s English-language films
1930s British films